Ars longa, vita brevis is a Latin translation of an aphorism coming originally from Greek, roughly meaning, "skilfulness takes time and life is short".

The aphorism quotes the first two lines of the Aphorismi by the ancient Greek physician Hippocrates.  The familiar Latin translation Ars longa, vita brevis reverses the order of the original lines, but can express the same principle.

Translations 
The original text, a standard Latin translation, and an English translation from the Greek follow.

Interpretation 
The most common and significant caveat made regarding the saying is that "art" (translating  tékhnē) originally meant "technique, craft" (as in The Art of War), not "fine art". Hippocrates was a physician who made this the opening statement in a medical text. The lines which follow: "The physician must not only be prepared to do what is right himself, but also to make the patient, the attendants, and externals cooperate." Thus in plainer language "it takes a long time to acquire and perfect one's expertise (in, say, medicine) and one has but a short time in which to do it". More generally, it may also refer to how time limits our accomplishments in life.

Similar sayings 
The late-medieval author Chaucer (–1400) observed "The lyf so short, the craft so long to lerne" ("The life so short, the craft so long to learn", the first line of the Parlement of Foules). The first-century CE rabbi Tarfon is quoted as saying "The day is short, the labor vast, the workers are lazy, the reward great, the Master urgent." (Avot 2:15) A light-hearted version in England, thought to have originated in Shropshire, is the pun "Bars longa, vita brevis" i.e. so many bars (or pubs) to visit, in so short a life.

Sheffield Medical School 

The motto of the Sheffield Medical School is "Ars longa, vita brevis".

See also
Bounded rationality
Parallelism (rhetoric)

References

External links
 

Latin words and phrases
Ancient Greek medicine
Catchphrases